XHGBO-FM is a radio station on 92.1 FM in General Bravo, Nuevo León. The station is owned by Grupo Radio Alegría and is known as ABC Deportes, simulcasting XEFZ-AM 660 in Monterrey.

History
XHGBO received its concession on November 23, 1994. For most of its first 25 years, it broadcast as a local station aimed at General Bravo, with the La Sabrosita format also on XHRK-FM 95.7 Monterrey and XHSBH-FM 100.9 in Sabinas Hidalgo.

In 2017, GRA conducted a power increase that made the station a rimshot into Monterrey proper. At the same time, GRA closed local operations in General Bravo and made XHGBO a simulcast of its AM station XEBJB-AM 570. On January 4, 2021, coinciding with the launch of sports talk station ABC Deportes on XEFZ-AM 660, XHGBO switched simulcast partners.

References

Radio stations in Nuevo León
Radio stations established in 1994
1994 establishments in Mexico